

Xinzhai is an early Bronze Age archaeological site that was found 1979 in Henan, China.

The culture in Xinzhai existed during the Xia dynasty and is dated from about 1870 BC to 1720 BC. The most prominent finding at Xinzhai is a cultural link between the older Longshan culture and the younger Erlitou culture, and the excavations at Xinzhai show traces of the two adjacent cultures. The city Xinzhai is believed to has been founded by King Qi of Xia, and was the capital of the Xia dynasty until Qi's descendant Shao Kang took control of the dynasty.

See also
Longshan culture
Erlitou culture

References

Notes

Printed References

Bronze Age in China
Xia dynasty
Archaeological sites in China
Major National Historical and Cultural Sites in Henan
1979 archaeological discoveries
19th-century BC establishments